Belleville Air Force Station is a closed United States Air Force General Surveillance Radar station. It was closed in 1968.

History
Belleville AFS was one of twenty-eight stations built as part of the second segment of the Air Defense Command permanent radar network, primarily to provide air defense radar coverage for Saint Louis and Scott Air Force Base. Prompted by the start of the Korean War, on July 11, 1950, the Secretary of the Air Force asked the Secretary of Defense for approval to expedite construction of the permanent network. Receiving the Defense Secretary's approval on July 21, the Air Force directed the Corps of Engineers to proceed with construction.

On 1 May 1951 the 798th Aircraft Control and Warning Squadron began operations. The site initially used AN/CPS-4 and AN/FPS-3 radars, and initially the station functioned as a Ground-Control Intercept (GCI) and warning station.  As a GCI station, the squadron's role was to guide interceptor aircraft toward unidentified intruders picked up on the unit's radar scopes.    The AN/FPS-3 remained in operation until 1963 (at which time it presumably was upgraded to an AN/FPS-20).

The United States Army established Army Air-Defense Command Post (AADCP) SL-47DC for Nike Missile air-defense system, St. Louis Defense Area in 1959 at Belleville. During 1962 Belleville AFS joined the Semi Automatic Ground Environment (SAGE) system, feeding data to DC-07 at Truax Field, Wisconsin. After joining, the squadron was redesignated as the 798th Radar Squadron (SAGE) on 1 March 1962.  The radar squadron provided information 24/7 the SAGE Direction Center where it was analyzed to determine range, direction altitude speed and whether or not aircraft were friendly or hostile.  On 31 July 1963, the site was redesignated as NORAD ID Z-70. In 1963 two AN/FPS-6 height-finder radars also stood guard. Later, during the mid-1960s, this site operated with an AN/FPS-66 search radar.

In addition to the main facility, Belleville operated five unmanned AN/FPS-18 Gap Filler sites:
 Edgewood, MO  (P-70B) 
 Vichy, MO     (P-70C) 
 Marquand, MO  (P-70D) 
 Neoga, IL     (P-70F) 
 Bowling Green, MO   (P-70G) 

The 798th Radar Squadron was discontinued along with the Army Command Post on 18 June 1968; the station was closed on 30 June. Today the former radar station has been redeveloped into a vocational rehabilitation center. Most of the former military buildings are still in use.  There is a small memorial on the site for its military use.

Air Force units and assignments

Units
 Constituted as the 798th Aircraft Control and Warning Squadron
 Activated on 1 May 1951
 Redesignated as 798th Radar Squadron (SAGE) on 1 March 1962
 Discontinued and inactivated on 18 June 1968

Assignments
 546th Aircraft Control and Warning Group, 1 May 1951
 159th Aircraft Control and Warning Group, 1 June 1951
 33d Air Division, 6 February 1952
 20th Air Division, 1 March 1956
 Kansas City Air Defense Sector, 1 January 1960
 Chicago Air Defense Sector, 1 July 1961
 20th Air Division, 1 April 1966
 30th Air Division, 1 December 1967 - 18 June 1968

See also
 List of USAF Aerospace Defense Command General Surveillance Radar Stations
 List of United States Air Force aircraft control and warning squadrons

References

 
 
 Information for Belleville AFS, IL

Installations of the United States Air Force in Illinois
Semi-Automatic Ground Environment sites
Aerospace Defense Command military installations
Military installations established in 1951
Military installations closed in 1968
1951 establishments in Illinois
1968 disestablishments in Illinois